Jeneen Interlandi is a staff writer at the New York Times magazine and a member of The New York Times editorial board.

Interlandi was born in Medellín, Colombia, adopted by Sicilian-Americans, and raised in Central New Jersey. After a bachelor's degree in biology at Rutgers University, Interlandi earned a M.A. in environmental science and M.S. in journalism at Columbia University. She was a 2013 Harvard University Nieman Fellow. She has written about health, science, and education since 2006. Before joining the Times, she was a staff writer at Consumer Reports and Newsweek, and a freelance journalist for several national magazines. She participated in The 1619 Project, with an essay highlighting the work of Rebecca Lee Crumpler.

References

 author page on Scientific American website

1977 births
Living people
Journalists from New Jersey
American women journalists
American people of Colombian descent
American science journalists
People from Medellín
The New York Times editorial board
21st-century American journalists
21st-century American women writers
Women science writers
American adoptees